Nyanza may refer to:

Nyanza, Rwanda
Nyanza District, the district surrounding Nyanza, Rwanda
Nyanza Province, Kenya
Nyanza Lac, Burundi
Nyanza, the Bantu word for lake, in particular:
Lake Albert (Africa) (Albert Nyanza)
Lake Edward (Edward Nyanza)
Lake Victoria (Victoria Nyanza)
Nyanza, an unincorporated area in the Municipality of the County of Victoria, Nova Scotia
, an Edwardian cargo steamship still trading on Lake  Victoria in East Africa
Nyanza (Company), a dye manufacturing company in Ashland, MA that went bankrupt in 1978
Shades of chartreuse#Nyanza, a hue

See also
 Mwanza (disambiguation)